Igor Nikolayevich Polyakov (15 July 1912 – 16 May 2008) was a rower who competed in the 1952 Summer Olympics for the Soviet Union and was the coxswain of the Soviet team that won the silver medal in the eights event. He was also a six-time Soviet champion. After finishing his sporting career, he became a rowing coach and won several awards and received several awards and recognition for his contributions as a coach. He died in Moscow in 2008.

References

1912 births
2008 deaths

Soviet male rowers
Coxswains (rowing)
Olympic rowers of the Soviet Union
Rowers at the 1952 Summer Olympics
Olympic silver medalists for the Soviet Union
Olympic medalists in rowing
Medalists at the 1952 Summer Olympics